The Council of Ministers of the Federal Government of Somalia consists of Ministers appointed by the Prime Minister. 
The Prime Minister may dismiss members of the council, and new appointees must again be approved by the Parliament. The Council meets weekly on Thursdays in Mogadishu. There may be additional meetings if circumstances require it. The Prime Minister chairs the meetings.

Constitutional and legal basis

Appointment
Article 97, Section 3 of the Constitution of the Somalia says that the Prime Minister

Functions of Council

An outline of the functions of the council are as follow:
Formulate the overall government policy and implement it;
Approve and implement administrative regulations, in accordance with the law;
Prepare draft laws, and table them before the House of the People of the Federal Parliament;
To set the budget and finance of the country.
The government is allowed to generate revenues from the people through the collection of taxes, fines, summons, custom duties, fees, etc.
To formulate national economic policies and development programs.
The council is responsible to formulate various development programs and projects for the development of the country. Examples are the New Economic Policy (NEP), the National Development Policy (NDP), and the National Vision Policy (NVP).
Implement laws, ensure national security, and protect state interests;
Law is proposed by the Executive and introduce in Parliament with the 1st, 2nd, and 3rd readings for approval.
Most provisions for the amendments of the constitution requires a 2/3 majority of the total number of Parliament.
Appoint and dismiss senior public officials;
Propose the appointment or dismissal of ambassadors, consuls and diplomats;
Exercise any other power conferred upon it by the Constitution or by other laws.

Council officials
On 19 October 2020, the Prime Minister Mohamed Hussein Roble submitted his nomination for the Council Members of the Federal Republic of Somalia and on 24 October 2020 they were approved by the parliament. They are currently as follows:

Council members

See also

Federal Parliament of Somalia

Notes

References

Politics of Somalia
Political organisations based in Somalia
Main
Somalia